Exaeretia umbraticostella is a moth in the family Depressariidae. It is found in North America, where it has been recorded from South Dakota and British Columbia to Texas and California.

The wingspan is 16–19 mm. The forewings are light reddish ochreous with small diffused blackish-fuscous spots on the costa and around the termen. There is a conspicuous, outwardly diffused blackish-fuscous shade on the middle of the costa, preceded by two minute discal dots of the same colour. There is a light fuscous shade from the costal patch, around the termen to near the middle of the inner margin. The hindwings are shining greyish fuscous.

The larvae feed on Balsamohirza sagittata and Helianthus pumilus.
They feed within tubes, formed from tied terminal leaves. A single larvae may construct several tubes. Full-grown larvae reach a length of 11–12 mm. They have a light yellowish body and light brown head. Pupation takes place in debris at the base of the plant.

References

Moths described in 1881
Exaeretia
Moths of North America